The Indo-Pacific sergeant (Abudefduf vaigiensis) is a species of damselfish in the family Pomacentridae. It may also be known as the Sergeant major although this name is usually reserved for the closely related species Abudefduf saxatilis. The closely related Abudefduf caudobimaculatus was formerly considered to be synonymous with this species and, according to some authorities, is synonymous.

Distribution

The Indo-Pacific sergeant is found in the Indo-Pacific including the Red Sea. Indian Ocean populations are found in the Red Sea, the Gulf of Aden, Arabia, the Persian Gulf, the Arabian Sea, the Maldives, eastern Africa, Madagascar, Seychelles, Sri Lanka, the Andaman Sea, Indonesia, Malaysia, and Australia. Populations in the Pacific Ocean are found in the Gulf of Thailand, Malaysia, Indonesia, the Philippines, Taiwan, Japan, the Yellow Sea, the Great Barrier Reef around Australia, New Zealand, and Pacific islands all the way to Hawaii. Likely introduced via Suez Canal in the Mediterranean Sea, where its distribution remains unclear due to possible confusion with Abudefduf saxatilis and Abudefduf troschelii.

Description
Abudefduf vaigiensis are white bluish with a yellow top. They have a black spot around their dorsal fin. It has yellow eyes. The dorsal fin on this fish has 13 dorsal spines and 11 to 14 dorsal soft rays. The anal fin on the Indo-Pacific sergeant has 2 anal spines and 11 to 13 anal soft rays. Males turn more blue during spawning. Many people confuse this fish for Abudefduf saxatilis, a closely related species found in the Atlantic Ocean.

Ecology

Diet
They feed on zooplankton, benthic algae, and small invertebrates.

Habitat
Adults live in coral reefs, tide pools, and rocky reefs. Larva of this species live in the open sea. It is found in tropical and subtropical waters.

Behavior
These fish form large aggregations. In the aggregations, individuals either feed in the midwater or tend their nests.

In the aquarium
This fish is found in the aquarium trade.

Hazards to humans
There have been reports of ciguatera poisoning from this fish.

Life Cycle

Early life
The larva hatch and drift out in to the pelagic zone. They drift in the waves and grow up until they go to a reef.

Breeding
Males turn more bluish during spawning. They build nests on rocks or coral ledges. Then, females lay their eggs in the nests and the male fertilizes them. Males guard and aerate the eggs until they hatch.

References

Further reading

External links
 Fishes of Australia : Abudefduf vaigiensis
 

Indo-Pacific sergeant
Marine fish of Northern Australia
Indo-Pacific sergeant